Erica Schroeder (born April 27, 1975), sometimes credited as Bella Hudson, is an American voice actress, best known for her role as Ilvira in the Netflix animated film hit, Secret Magic Control Agency, ranked #1 in the world on Netflix in April 2021. She’s also known as the voices of Cheese and Cat in the animated series Boy Girl Dog Cat Mouse Cheese, as Lyserg Diethel in both anime adaptations of Shaman King, the voice of Devos in World of Warcraft: Shadowlands, and the voice of Emma Frost in Joss Whedon’s Astonishing X-Men.

Schroeder was the original English language voice of Blaze the Cat in Sonic the Hedgehog. Other roles she is known for are Luffy in One Piece (4Kids dub), Mai Valentine, Akiza Izinski and Dark Magician Girl in Yu-Gi-Oh, and Nurse Joy and Eevee in Pokémon. She has been a major presence in the world of animation and has voiced over 250 roles for video games and animation since 2002. She is set to appear as Elita in Signe Baumane’s animated feature, My Love Affair with Marriage, in late 2021, with Cameron Monaghan and Emma Kenney of Shameless, and Matthew Modine of Stranger Things. She was in the original casts and cast albums of Jane Eyre and Shout! The Mod Musical. She is the mother of voice actress Madigan Kacmar, who appeared in the Golden Globe and Oscar-nominated Mirai, and is married to composer Kenneth Kacmar.

Filmography

Anime

Animation

Films

Video games

References

External links
 

 
 
 

Living people
American voice actresses
Place of birth missing (living people)
American video game actresses
Actresses from New York City
21st-century American actresses
Sega people
1975 births